The 1980 LSU Tigers football team represented Louisiana State University (LSU) during the 1980 NCAA Division I-A football season.

Bo Rein was hired November 30, 1979 after four seasons at North Carolina State as the successor to Charles McClendon, who compiled a 137–59–7 record in 18 seasons. Rein's tenure was cut short after only 42 days when he died in a plane crash January 10, 1980.  Jerry Stovall, a former LSU All-American and nine-year National Football League veteran with the St. Louis Cardinals, was approved as Rein's successor approximately 36 hours after the plane crash.

LSU was tied for first place in the Southeastern Conference following a Nov. 1 victory over Ole Miss, but subsequent one-sided road losses to Alabama and Mississippi State led bowls to snub the Tigers. LSU ended on a high note by drubbing bowl-bound Tulane.

As of 2021, this is the last LSU team to finish with a winning record and not be invited to a bowl.

Schedule

Roster

References

LSU
LSU Tigers football seasons
LSU Tigers football